Shaw Mayer's water rat (Baiyankamys shawmayeri) is a semiaquatic species of rodent in the family Muridae.
It is found in the mountains of Papua New Guinea.

Names
It is known as kuypep kuykuy-sek in the Kalam language of Papua New Guinea.

References

Rodents of Papua New Guinea
Mammals described in 1943
Taxa named by Martin Hinton
Baiyankamys
Taxonomy articles created by Polbot
Rodents of New Guinea